Radio Garcia-Serra was a Cuban radio station founded in 1929.

History 
Jorge Garcia-Serra founded Radio Garcia-Serra in Havana, Cuba in late 1929. The radio station was the second radio station established in Havana, and transmitted under the call letters CMCU at a frequency of 660 kc which, at the time and throughout the 1950s, was the only frequency with a clear international frequency that could not be blocked or interfered.

In the early stages, Radio Garcia-Serra broadcast music and on-air novellas written by distinguished Cuban and Spanish writers of the time.

During the late 1940s and 1950s, the children of Jorge Garcia-Serra owned and managed the radio station, and Roberto Garcia-Serra was named the General Manager.

In the late 1940s, when studio live radio-broadcast performances were common, Radio Garcia-Serra broadcast a program at 5 PM called “Tea Hour” (Hora del Té) where Celia Cruz, the world-famous singer and representative of Cuba, had her beginnings.

Also making a debut in Radio Garcia-Serra in that same year was Fajardo y sus Estrellas. Other late 1950s studio live performances included, Orquesta Aragón, Orquesta Sensación y Barbarito Diez.

References

Radio stations established in 1929
Radio stations disestablished in 1959
Radio stations in Cuba